is a Japanese tokusatsu drama produced by Tsuburaya Productions. It is the 32nd entry to the Ultra Series  and the eighth entry to the  lineup, celebrating the 10th anniversary of Ultraman Zero. It premiered in TV Tokyo on June 20, 2020.

Synopsis 

Remnants of Ultraman Belial, known as the Devil Splinters, were scattered across the universe and turned infected monsters into berserkers. To combat the resulting chaos, the Land of Light created the Ultra Medals and Z Risers, but several of these devices were stolen by Celebro, forcing Ultraman Zero and his self-proclaimed disciple Z to chase it to the Earth. Z carried out his incapacitated master's mission and the Z Riser to recover the stolen Ultra Medals on Earth, where he bonded with STORAGE officer Haruki Natsukawa to combat the space monster Genegarg. Ever since then, Haruki assisted Z in reclaiming lost Ultra Medals and at the same time defending mankind from monsters and extraterrestrial threats. Haruki's mission as a STORAGE member is accompanied by his senior/ace pilot Yoko Nakashima, the young scientist Yuka Ohta, the elderly repairman Kojiro Inaba and his captain Shota Hebikura, whose true identity is Jugglus Juggler from Ultraman Orb.

Meanwhile, the space parasite Celebro took possession of a youth named Shinya Kaburagi to create chaos and experiment with the Ultra's technology to harbor the power of monsters. In addition to Ultraman Z, he is also assisted by guests appearing as Ultras; Riku/Ultraman Geed, Zero, and his godfather Ace. STORAGE begins to create stronger machines and armaments, but as the series progressed, Celebro took over the GAFJ director Kuriyama to further the advancements of new weaponries and disbanded STORAGE. His true plan is to provoke mankind into creating their strongest weapon and turn it against them. He eventually possessed Yoko to hijack Ultroid Zero and transform it into the cyborg monster known as Destrudos to initiate his Civilization Self-Destruction Game on Earth. Juggler reforms STORAGE to rescue Yoko as Haruki succeeded through sheer will, forcing Celebro to abandon her and possessed Destrudos as a last resort. After being knocked out of his strongest form, Ultraman Z unleashed his full power to destroy Destrudos and finally save Earth. Celebro was captured by STORAGE and a vengeful Kaburagi to be dissected as Juggler resigned from the team to leave Earth. Haruki retains his bond with Z, but instead of staying in STORAGE, he decided to leave for outer space to continue Z's mission as an Ultraman, though he assured the rest of STORAGE that he would return to Earth on regular occasions.

Production 
The entire project was conceived by Tsuburaya Productions with a different draft and story composition. Chief producer Tsugumi Kitaura offered Taguchi the role of the main director in August 2019 and the latter requested the inclusion of Kota Fukihara, as well as the pair to rewrite the original draft to their own preference. Production of the series started two months earlier than most of the New Generation Heroes series so as to anticipate the 2020 Summer Olympics prior to its initial postponement from the COVID-19 pandemic in Japan. He also invited a screenwriter named Keigo Koyanagi and military supervisor Yasuhiro Koshi to provide an in-depth accuracy to the themes of military. Because Taguchi had participated in most of the New Generation Heroes instalments since Ultraman Ginga S, he decided to turn Ultraman Z as his own version of the line's conclusion. Jugglus Juggler's inclusion into the series was to expand his character after his last appearance in Ultraman Orb.

In previous entries of the Ultra Series, the defense team concept was dropped out so as to save the production cost, but Taguchi proposed the inclusion of giant robots as alternatives to combat vehicles. The first to be created was King Joe STORAGE Custom, but Sevenger was introduced earlier in the series to garner attention from fans for its cuter appeal. The late inclusion of King Joe was to emphasize STORAGE's growth as an attack team and to prevent it from overshadowing Ultraman Z in the early episodes.

The show's name was trademarked in China on December 27, 2019, and later in Japan on January 21, 2020, around 3 month before its announcement. Ultraman Z was immediately announced by official website of Tsuburaya Productions on March 26, 2020. As the first trailer of the series was released on April 16, 2020, the official website of Tsuburaya Productions quickly announced Kiyotaka Taguchi as its main director, Tatsuomi Hamada's return as the show's supporting cast and finally Masaaki Endoh and Nami Tamaki singing the opening and ending themes respectively. The entire cast members of STORAGE and GAFJ members made their live broadcast on June 5, 2020. Automobile manufacturing company Toyota announced their cooperation in the series production by providing Toyota LQ as STORAGE's main transport.

After his passing on May 17, Kōta Fukihara's role as the story editor was subsequently taken over by Taguchi, with Tsuburaya Productions and the production staffs of Ultraman Z publishing their tribute in the official sites. According to Kohshu Hirano, filming of Ultraman Z was among those affected by the COVID-19 pandemic in Japan and went postponed for two months before it was resumed. This happened at some point before the series premiere on June 20.

Episodes

Ultraman Z & Ultraman Zero Voice Drama
 is a series of 24-episode audio dramas streamed on Tsuburaya Productions' YouTube channel. The series focuses on Ultraman Z's encounter with Ultraman Zero back in the Land of Light.

Other media

Ultra Galaxy Fight: The Absolute Conspiracy
 is the second of the Ultra Galaxy Fight miniseries to be made and set to air on YouTube on November 22, 2020. In addition to being a prequel series, the title character of Ultraman Z made his appearance as one of the characters involved.

Fight! Sevenger
 is a manga spin-off that has been serialized in the Televi-Kun magazine since the April 2021 issue. It is written by Kiyotaka Taguchi and illustrated by Tetsuya Kawaishi, the latter having served as a storyboard artist in episodes 12 and 14 of Ultraman Z. It serves as a prequel to the television series, taking place prior to the arrival of Ultraman Z on Earth. The events of the special episode take place during Sevenger's decommit in the television series.
N/A

SP1. 
SP2.

Sevenger Fight
 is a 10-episode miniseries based on the low-budget miniseries Ultra Fight, released as a pay-per-view content. All mini episodes are directed and written by Kiyotaka Taguchi and Junichiro Ashiki respectively, while Kohshu Hirano, Rima Matsuda, Hikari Kuroki and Takaya Aoyagi provided the background voices.

Life's Decision Height: The Story of STORAGE's Foundation
 is a two-part novel spin-off released on Tsuburaya Imagination. It is written and supervised by Keigo Koyanagi and Kiyotaka Taguchi respectively, and serves as a prequel to the television series from GAFJ's perspective.

Ja no Michi wa Hebi
 is a short novel spin-off included in the Ultraman Z Perfect Super Complete Works book. It is written by Takao Nakano and supervised by Kiyotaka Taguchi and Tsuburaya Productions, and serves as a prequel to the television series from Jugglus Juggler's perspective.

Cast 
: 
: 
: 
/: 
: 
: 
: 
: 
: 
: 
: 
/: 
: 
: 
STORAGE AI voice: 
: 
Ultra Z Riser announcement:

Guest cast 

: 
:

Theme songs 
Opening theme

Arrangement:  (KEYTONE),  (KEYTONE)
Lyrics, Composition, & Artist: 
Episodes: 1-13 (Verse 1); 14–24, SP3 (Verse 2)
In episode 25, this song is used as an insert song.

Ending themes
"Connect the Truth"
Lyrics, Composition, & Arrangement: 
Artist: 
Episodes: 1-13
In episode 15, this song is used as an insert song.
"Promise for the future"
Lyrics: 
Composition: 
Arrangement: ats-,  & Toru Watanabe (Blue Bird's Nest)
Artist: Tasuku Hatanaka
Episodes: 14-24
In episode 25, this song is used as an insert song.

International broadcast
In Hong Kong, this series aired on ViuTV on May 15, 2021. In Philippines, this series aired on GMA on July 24, 2022.

Reception
Ultraman Z was ranked sixth place on 2020's "100 Internet Buzzwords" in Japan, held by Nico Nico Pedia and Pixiv Encyclopedia. The physical award was given to director Kiyotaka Taguchi during the award ceremony on December 15, 2020. Shota Hebikura, the alias of Jugglus Juggler in the series was also one of many entries in said award, having ranked 45th place. Taguchi admitted that Ultraman Z being an action-packed series was to originally anticipate the Olympics. On July 21, 2021, Ultraman Z was labelled as the winner of the Best Dramatic Presentation category from the Seiun Award, making the series as the second entry in Ultra Series to obtain the award after Ultraman Tiga in 1998.

In addition to television airing, episodes of Ultraman Z were rebroadcast on YouTube for worldwide audience to watch, at Taguchi's suggestion, which also included English subtitles. According to Taguchi's interview in August 2020, the first episode met with good reception from various audience in the worldwide, especially the United States.

Anime mecha designer and former Bandai employee Tsuyoshi Nonaka wrote his commentary in the fortieth Ultra Tokusatsu Perfect Mook, pertaining to Ultraman Z, he applauded Taguchi for the use of robots for defense team, an idea that the former actually brought to Bandai in the 1990s, but was rejected out of fear that the Ultraman would be overshadowed. Nonaka compares Beliarok, the sentient sword that is used by the eponymous Ultraman Z, to the Byakkoshinken from Gosei Sentai Dairanger, but he felt that the sword's introduction into the show is abrupt and sees the interaction of an Ultraman Belial-based character with Ultraman Z and Haruki is unfit. This is because due to Ultraman Belial's interaction with other Ultras would have been Zero and Geed, therefore suggesting that Juggler would be a better candidate due to his frequent run-in with the main characters of the series, as well as sharing a neutrality stance in any conflict being similar to Beliarok as well.

See also 
Ultra Series - Complete list of official Ultraman-related shows.

Notes

References

External links 
Ultraman Z at Tsuburaya Productions 
Ultraman Z at TV Tokyo 

2020 Japanese television series debuts
Ultra television series
TV Tokyo original programming